The Joint Meritorious Unit Award (JMUA) is a US military award that was established on June 4, 1981, by Secretary of Defense Caspar Weinberger and was implemented by Department of Defense Directive 1348.27 dated July 22, 1982. The Joint Meritorious Unit Award was made retroactive to January 23, 1979.

History
Authorized by the Secretary of Defense on June 10, 1981, this award was originally called the Department of Defense Meritorious Unit Award. It is awarded in the name of the Secretary of Defense to joint activities for meritorious achievement or service, superior to that which is normally expected, for actions in the following situations; combat with an armed enemy of the United States, a declared national emergency, or under extraordinary circumstances that involve national interests.

The first organization to receive the Joint Meritorious Unit Award was the "Electronic Warfare During Close Air Support Joint Test Force" and was awarded the decoration on September 30, 1982. The JMUA was also awarded to U.S. Marines and the U.S. Navy who served in Somalia in the early 1990s.

It was awarded for Operation Praying Mantis in 1988.

The Joint Meritorious Unit Award is a ribbon, enclosed in a gold frame. Navy, Marine Corps, Air Force, Space Force, and Coast Guard recipients wear a different, smaller frame than do U.S. Army, as the latters' unit awards are displayed at a different location on the uniform. The ribbon is very similar to the Defense Superior Service Medal, indicative of the fact that the service performed would warrant the award of the medal to an individual. Subsequent decorations of the Joint Meritorious Unit Award are annotated with oak leaf clusters.

References

External links

Awards and decorations of the United States Department of Defense
Awards established in 1981